The Vancouver Island Trail (formerly also known as the Vancouver Island Spine Trail) is a near-completed 800 km-long hiking trail stretching the length of Vancouver Island, from its southern terminus on Anderson Hill in Oak Bay, to its northern terminus in Cape Scott Provincial Park. The trail connects to various communities including Victoria, Lake Cowichan, Port Alberni and Cumberland, and connects along existing trails the Galloping Goose Regional Trail, Cowichan Valley Trail, Alberni Inlet Trail, the Great Trail and the North Coast Trail.  

The trail is intended to be accessible to hikers five months of the year, with some sections available much longer. The first thru-hiker completed the trail in July 2018. It is estimated that thru-hiking the trail may take between six weeks to over two months. As of 2021 the trail is over 90% completed. Some sections of the trail will be available where it is accessible for non-motorized trail users, including bicycles or horse riders.  

The hiking trail project is being built and maintained by the non-profit Vancouver Island Trail Association (VITA).  VITA is a part of 'Hike BC', the British Columbia wing of the National Hiking Trail (NHT).

References

External links
Vancouver Island Trail Association

Hiking trails in British Columbia